Aleksandrs Isakovs (born 16 September 1973 in Daugavpils) is a Latvian former professional footballer who played as a defender. He made 58 appearances for the Latvia national team. He debuted in 1997, and played at the Euro 2004. He started his career in Dinaburg FC, and played for Lokomotiv Nizhniy Novgorod, before joining Latvian champion team Skonto FC. He ended his career in FK Daugava Daugavpils.

After the end of his career, Isakovs became the sporting director of his former club Daugava Daugavpils. On 22 October 2012, he waas appointed head of Daugavpils Sport administration. Isakovs' specialty is also a sports teacher.

After retiring from professional football Isakovs began playing futsal. He participated at the Daugavpils futsal championship, winning the gold medals in the 2009–10 season.

References

External links
Latvian Football Federation 

1973 births
Living people
Latvian people of Russian descent
Sportspeople from Daugavpils
Latvian footballers
Association football defenders
Latvia international footballers
UEFA Euro 2004 players
Russian Premier League players
Skonto FC players
FC Daugava players
FC Lokomotiv Nizhny Novgorod players
FC Spartak Vladikavkaz players
FC Volgar Astrakhan players
Latvian expatriate footballers
Latvian expatriate sportspeople in Russia
Expatriate footballers in Russia